The following lists events that happened during 2014 in Serbia.

Incumbents 
 President: Tomislav Nikolić
 Prime Minister: Ivica Dačić (until 27 April), Aleksandar Vučić (starting 27 April)

Events

March
 March 16 – Serbian parliamentary election, 2014. Voters in Serbia go to the polls for an early parliamentary election. The centre-right SNS is reported to be receiving around 50% of the popular vote.
 March 16 – Belgrade local election, 2014

May
 May 13–19 – 2014 Southeast Europe floods. 57 deaths in Serbia.

August
 August 29 – Orlovac incident.

October
On October 16, 2014, a military parade by the Serbian Army was held in front of more than 100,000 spectators for the 70th anniversary of the Soviet Red Army liberating city of Belgrade from Nazi Germany. The parade was also part of Russian president Vladimir Putin's official visit. Besides Putin who was the parade's centerpiece guest, the main stand featured Serbian dignitaries, president Tomislav Nikolić and prime minister Aleksandar Vučić as well as Republika Srpska president Milorad Dodik and Republika Srpska prime minister Željka Cvijanović.

Building projects
Pupinov Bridge to be finished in December 2014.
West 65 to be finished in 2014.
Airport City Belgrade underway since April 2009.
Belgrade bypass underway since 2005.
Belgrade Waterfront initiated in early 2014.

Sport

Football
Serbia v Albania (UEFA Euro 2016 qualifying) - the match was interrupted and ultimately cancelled after several instances of hooliganism from both sides, including Serbian fans chanting "Death to Albanians", throwing flares and other objects onto the pitch, and a drone flying an Albanian nationalist banner over the field.

Basketball
2013–14 Basketball League of Serbia: Season winners were KK FMP
2013–14 Radivoj Korać Cup: Winners were KK Crvena Zvezda
2014 FIBA Europe Under-20 Championship Bronze
2014 FIBA Under-17 World Championship Bronze
2014 FIBA Basketball World Cup Silver

Water polo
2014 FINA Men's Water Polo World League Champions
2014 Men's European Water Polo Championship Champions
2013–14 Prva A liga (men's water polo): Winners were VK Crvena Zvezda

Tennis
Novak Djokovic tennis season: Runner-up at 2014 French Open – Men's Singles. Lost against Rafael Nadal.
Novak Djokovic tennis season: Winner at 2014 Wimbledon Championships – Men's Singles. Won against Roger Federer.

Olympics
Serbia at the 2014 Winter Olympics
Serbia at the 2014 Summer Youth Olympics

Paralympics
Serbia at the 2014 Winter Paralympics

Deaths

References 

 
Years of the 21st century in Serbia
2010s in Serbia
Serbia
Serbia